Betsizaraina is a rural commune located in Atsinanana, at the east coast of Madagascar.
It is located south of Mahanoro at the mouth of the Mangoro River to the Indian Ocean.

Agriculture
The economy is based on agriculture, including cloves oil.

References

Populated places in Atsinanana